John McAnulty was a grain importer and an alleged informant from south County Armagh, killed by the Provisional Irish Republican Army (IRA) .

McAnulty, a Catholic, was abducted by the IRA on 17 July 1989 in the Republic of Ireland, tortured, and shot dead. His body was found the following day at Culloville, South Armagh.

McAnulty was named at the Smithwick Tribunal as an intelligence source, and said to be involved in smuggling. He is said to have informed the Royal Ulster Constabulary  that Garda Síochána Sergeant Owen Corrigan was colluding with the IRA, and that this led to his death.

See also

 Thomas Murphy (Irish republican)
 Smithwick Tribunal
 1989 Jonesborough ambush
 Loughgall Ambush
 Internal Security Unit
 Force Research Unit
 Eamon Collins
 John Joe McGee

External links
 http://cain.ulst.ac.uk/sutton/chron/1989.html
 https://www.bbc.com/news/uk-northern-ireland-18032115
 http://saoirse32.wordpress.com/tag/john-mcanulty/
 http://www.belfasttelegraph.co.uk/news/local-national/republic-of-ireland/reopen-iragarda-collusion-probe-30132108.html
 https://www.bbc.com/news/uk-northern-ireland-19993392

1989 deaths
People from County Armagh
People killed by the Provisional Irish Republican Army
Terrorism deaths in Northern Ireland
People murdered in Northern Ireland
People killed during The Troubles (Northern Ireland)
Irish victims of crime
Year of birth missing
1989 murders in the United Kingdom